The final of the fourth season of the Copa Paulino Alcantara was contested by Kaya–Iloilo and United City on neutral ground at the PFF National Training Center in Carmona, Cavite.

Background
Unlike the previous editions of the Copa Paulino Alcantara, all seven teams of the Philippines Football League were drawn into one large group stage dubbed as the "Elimination round", where each team played the other teams once. Kaya came into the competition as the defending cup champions, having won the 2021 cup tournament against the Azkals Development Team, while this was United City's first Copa under current management after MMC Sportz took control of the club following the financial problems of the previous owner, Leo Rey Yanson. United City (in the form of Ceres-Negros), last won the 2019 final against Kaya. 

Kaya and United City met in the elimination round on March 28, with United City taking the lead through captain Mike Ott. Kaya equalized in the second half through Japanese winger Daizo Horikoshi, with the match eventually ending 1–1. Horikoshi would end up with the most goals in the elimination round, scoring 5 in 6 matches as Kaya went through the round unbeaten, snatching top spot with a 3–0 over second-placed Dynamic Herb Cebu on the last matchday. United City likewise got through the round unbeaten, but finished in third due to draws with Dynamic Herb Cebu, Mendiola 1991, and a draw on the last matchday against Stallion Laguna that saw the latter qualify for the semifinals.

In the semifinals, Kaya were without the services of Carlyle Mitchell after the defender got into an argument with Stallion defender Kameron Bolden over refereeing in Kaya's 3–2 over Stallion. The tournament's leading scorer Daizo Horikoshi scored the eventual winner in the last 10 minutes after close attempts from both sides. United City faced Dynamic Herb Cebu, who were without the services of Turkish defender Nazim Özcan, who was suspended on the last matchday of the elimination round. Simen Lyngbø likewise scored the only goal in the game after Ace Villanueva's missed clearance.

Route to the final

Match summary

The final of the 2022 Copa Paulino Alcantara was held on May 22, 2022 in the PFF National Training Center in Carmona, Cavite. While the previous edition's final was held in a bubble format with no spectators allowed to watch, this year's final saw a nearly packed out crowd due to the easing of COVID-19 cases in the Philippines. Kaya fielded a full-strength lineup, but were without the services of Japanese midfielder Ryo Fujii due to the league only allowing four foreigners during one match. Jovin Bedic, Sandro Reyes, and Oskari Kekkonen also recently returned from national team duty in the 2021 Southeast Asian Games, but Kekkonen played the entire match while Bedic was subbed on. United City fielded an almost full-strength lineup, although Tajikistani midfielder Amirbek Juraboev was recovering from an injury, as well as called up to the national team for the AFC Asian Cup qualification matches. Kaya last won the tournament in 2021 over the Azkals Development Team, while United City's predecessors, Ceres–Negros, won the Copa in 2019, versus Kaya, after fielding only 12 outfield players.

After only 11 minutes, the match saw the first goal, with Curt Dizon's lofted ball falling just outside the box, where Kenshiro Daniels, who scored for Kaya in the 2021 final, scored after confusion between Zach Banzon and Carlyle Mitchell, becoming the only player to score in three successive Copa finals, scoring a consolation in the 2019 final and the winner in the 2021 final. However, only 3 minutes later, a defensive error from Alan Robertson saw Senegalse forward Robert Lopez Mendy steal into the box and score an equalizer. Kaya proceeded to dominate the match, with Kaya midfielder Jesus Melliza eventually scoring his third goal of the campaign from outside the box. Kaya went into the half 2–1 up, but United City were growing into the match. In the second half, Hikaru Minegishi, who last played for Global Cebu in the finals series, scored with a perfectly timed volley that launched the ball into the top corner. United City became more aggressive and found the winner, as Mark Hartmann's low corner was volleyed home by captain Mike Ott. Kaya pushed for a late equalizer, but Anthony Pinthus came up with several fine saves to bring United City their first ever Copa Paulino Alcantara title.

The match ended with United City 3–2 victors over Kaya, in the highest-scoring Copa final to date. In doing so, they qualified for the group stages of the 2023–24 AFC Cup, although they still might qualify for the 2023–24 AFC Champions League through the 2022 Philippines Football League, which starts in June of 2022. The final also saw another record as Audie Menzi and Jovin Bedic became the first players to appear in four Copa finals, having first appeared in the inaugural final in 2018.

Anthony Pinthus' fine performance saw him win Player of the match, with two individual awards going United City's way, with Pinthus also winning the Golden Glove and Mike Ott winning Golden Ball. Kaya's Daizo Horikoshi won Golden Boot by scoring six goals in the tournament, 2 more than Dynamic Herb Cebu's Arda Çınkır.

References

Final 2022
Copa Paulino Alcantara Final